Look at Us is the debut album by American pop duo Sonny & Cher, released in 1965 by Atco Records. The album reached number two on the Billboard 200 and was certified gold.

Album information
Shortly after their single "I Got You Babe" had reached number 1 on both sides of the Atlantic, Sonny Bono quickly put together an album for himself and Cher to release in late 1965 to capitalize on its success. Much like the single, this album was also a hit, peaking at the number 2 position on the Billboard 200 for 8 weeks. It also went top ten in the UK, reaching #7. Other than "I Got You Babe", the album contains the Billboard Hot 100 top 20 hit single "Just You" and the minor hit single "The Letter", which peaked at #75.

The cover was designed by Haig Adishian and photographed by Robert W. Young.

The song "Sing C'est la Vie" was covered in 1968 by future ABBA star Agnetha Fältskog with Swedish lyrics as a non-album duet-single with fellow Swedish singer Jörgen Edman entitled "Sjung denna sång".

Track listing

Side A
"I Got You Babe" (Sonny Bono) – 3:12
"Unchained Melody"  (Hy Zaret, Alex North) – 3:52
"Then He Kissed Me" (Phil Spector, Ellie Greenwich, Jeff Barry) – 2:56
"Sing C'est la Vie" (Sonny Bono, Charles Green, Brian Stone) – 3:39
"It's Gonna Rain" (Sonny Bono) – 2:24
"500 Miles" (Hedy West) – 3:55

Side B
"Just You" (Sonny Bono) – 3:36
"The Letter"  (Don Harris, Dewey Terry) – 2:09
"Let It Be Me" (Gilbert Bécaud, Mann Curtis, Pierre Delanoë) – 2:25
"You Don't Love Me" (Bo Diddley, Willie Cobbs) – 2:32
"You've Really Got a Hold on Me" (Smokey Robinson) – 2:24
"Why Don't They Let Us Fall in Love" (Phil Spector, Ellie Greenwich, Jeff Barry) – 2:29

Charts

Weekly charts

Year-end charts

Certifications and sales

Personnel
Cher - co-lead vocals
Sonny Bono - co-lead vocals
Frank Capp - drums
Barney Kessel - guitar
Don Randi - piano
Lyle Ritz - bass guitar
Steve Mann - guitar
Hal Blaine - drums
Harold Battiste - piano
Monte Dunn - guitar
Gene Estes - percussion
Cliff Hills - bass guitar
Donald Peake - guitar
Michel Rubini - harpsichord
Brian Stone - percussion

Production
Producer: Sonny Bono
Engineer: Stan Ross
Arranger: Harold Battiste Jr.

References

1965 debut albums
Sonny & Cher albums
Atco Records albums
Atlantic Records albums
Albums produced by Sonny Bono
Albums recorded at Gold Star Studios
Albums arranged by Harold Battiste